This is a list of French soups and stews. French cuisine consists of cooking traditions and practices from France, famous for rich tastes and subtle nuances with a long and rich history.

French soups and stews

Bisque
Bouillabaisse – a stew of mixed herbs, fish, and vegetables.
Consommé
French onion soup
Garbure – a thick French soup or stew of ham with cabbage and other vegetables, usually with cheese and stale bread added.
Lettuce soup
Oille – a French potée or soup believed to be the forerunner of pot-au-feu composed of various meats and vegetables.
Potée
Ragout
Ragout fin – its origin in France is not confirmed but the dish is also known in Germany as Würzfleisch, although use of the French name is more common nowadays.
Ratatouille – a vegetable stew with olive oil, aubergine, courgette, bell pepper, tomato, onion and garlic
Tourin – a type of French garlic soup
Vichyssoise – its origins are a subject of debate among culinary historians; Julia Child calls it "an American invention", whereas others observe that "the origin of the soup is questionable in whether it's genuinely French or an American creation".

See also

 List of soups
 List of stews

References

Further reading
 
  224 pages.

 
France
Soups and stews